Gunn Lisbeth Nyborg (born 21 March 1960 in Oslo) is a former Norwegian football player who played for the club Asker Fotball and for Norway women's national football team.

Career
Nyborg was part of the Norwegian team winning the 1988 FIFA Women's Invitation Tournament (unofficial World Cup). She played on the Norwegian team that won silver medals at the 1991 FIFA Women's World Cup in China.

Playing 110 matches for the Norway women's national football team in a row, Nyborg was awarded the FIFA Order of Merit. Her achievements with the national team include winning the gold medal at the 1987 European Competition for Women's Football, as well as silver medals in 1989 and 1991.

Personal life
Nyborg was born in Oslo on 21 March 1960.

References

1960 births
Living people
Norwegian women's footballers
FIFA Century Club
Norway women's international footballers
Toppserien players
Norwegian expatriate women's footballers
Nadeshiko League players
Asker Fotball (women) players
Nikko Securities Dream Ladies players
Expatriate women's footballers in Japan
1991 FIFA Women's World Cup players
Footballers from Oslo
UEFA Women's Championship-winning players
Women's association footballers not categorized by position